Daniela De Ridder (born 27 November 1962) is a German-Belgian politician of the Social Democratic Party (SPD) who has served as a member of the Bundestag from the state of Lower Saxony from 2013 until 2021 and again since May 2022.

Political career 
De Ridder first became a member of the Bundestag after the 2013 German federal election, representing the Mittelems district. She was a member of the Committee for Education, Research and Technology Assessment before moving to the Committee on Foreign Affairs and its Sub-Committee on Civilian Crisis Prevention in 2018. She was the committee's deputy chairwoman until September 2021. 

In addition to her committee assignments, De Ridder has served as deputy chairwoman of the German Parliamentary Friendship Group with Belgium and Luxembourg (2014-2018) and the German-French Parliamentary Friendship Group (2018-2021). Since 2018, she has also been part of the German delegation to the Parliamentary Assembly of the Organization for Security and Co-operation in Europe (OSCE). In 2020, she joined the Inter-Parliamentary Alliance on China.

In the Bundestag election on September 26, 2021, De Ridder initially missed re-entry into parliament; by June 2022, she took the seat of Yasmin Fahimi who had resigned from parliament.

Other activities 
 German Foundation for Peace Research (DSF), Member of the Board (2014-2018)

References

External links 

  
 Bundestag biography 

1962 births
Living people
Members of the Bundestag for Lower Saxony
Female members of the Bundestag
21st-century German women politicians
Members of the Bundestag 2017–2021
Members of the Bundestag 2013–2017
Members of the Bundestag for the Social Democratic Party of Germany